Euriphene coerulea, the western nymph, is a butterfly in the family Nymphalidae. It is found in Guinea, Sierra Leone, Liberia, Ivory Coast, western Ghana and western Nigeria. The habitat consists of forests.

References

Butterflies described in 1847
Euriphene